Boulder Media Limited is an Irish animation studio founded by filmmaker Robert Cullen in 2000. It is currently a subsidiary of Australian media company Princess Pictures.

History 

Cullen founded Boulder Media in 2000. On 13 July 2016, it became a subsidiary of Hasbro. Boulder Media opened a second location in August 2017 in Dublin on Claremont Road.

On 7 May 2019, Hasbro and Boulder Media announced a new animation film studio to be started. The companies bid on an old ferry terminal for the studio, but was turned down by the Dún Laoghaire-Rathdown County Council.

On 1 November 2022, Hasbro sold Boulder Media to Australian media company Princess Pictures, known for producing adult animation series Smiling Friends, YOLO, and Koala Man under its Bento Box Entertainment joint venture Princess Bento.

Filmography

Animated series

Shorts

Specials

Feature films

See also 
 Allspark Animation
 Film Roman
 Klasky Csupo
 Saerom Animation
 AKOM
 Rough Draft Studios
 Sunwoo Entertainment
 Wang Film Productions
 Hong Ying Animation
 Toon City
 Bardel Entertainment
 Bento Box Entertainment
 Titmouse, Inc.
 Mercury Filmworks
 ShadowMachine
 Jam Filled Entertainment
 Yowza! Animation
 Atomic Cartoons
 Guru Studio
 WildBrain

References

External links 
 
 Boulder Media on Vimeo

Companies based in Dublin (city)
Mass media companies established in 2000
Irish animation studios
Irish companies established in 2000
2016 mergers and acquisitions
Irish subsidiaries of foreign companies
2022 mergers and acquisitions
Former Hasbro subsidiaries